Maro is a name used as both a given name and surname, masculine and feminine, in different cultures. Notable people with the name include:

Given name
Publius Vergilius Maro, a Roman poet
Maron (died 410), a Syriac Christian saint, founder of what is now known as the Maronite Church
Maro Ajemian (1921–1978), an Armenian-American pianist
Maro Kontou (born 1934), a Greek actress and politician
Maro Douka (born 1947), a Greek novelist
Maro Litra (born 1970), a Canadian-Greek singer
Maro Balić (born 1971), a Croatian water polo player
Maro Sargsyan (born 1973), an Armenian artist
Maro Engel (born 1985), a German racing driver
Maro Joković (born 1987), a Croatian water polo player
Maro Itoje (born 1994), an English rugby union player

Surname
Virgil (Publius Vergilius Maro; 70 BC–19 BC), an ancient Roman poet
Akaji Maro (born 1943), a Japanese actor, dancer, and theater director
Judith Maro (1919–2011), a Ukrainian-born Welsh-language writer
Marlon Maro (born 1965), a Filipino footballer and coach

See also
Maro (disambiguation)